The 2022–23 season is the 130th season in the existence of Hertha BSC and the club's 10th consecutive season in the top flight of German football. In addition to the domestic league, Hertha BSC participated in this season's edition of the DFB-Pokal. The season covers the period from 1 July 2022 to 30 June 2023.

Players

Players out on loan

Transfers

In

Out

Pre-season and friendlies

Competitions

Overall record

Bundesliga

League table

Results summary

Results by round

Matches 
The league fixtures were announced on 17 June 2022.

DFB-Pokal

Statistics

Appearances and goals

|-
! colspan=14 style=background:#dcdcdc; text-align:center| Goalkeepers 

|-
! colspan=14 style=background:#dcdcdc; text-align:center| Defenders
 

|-
! colspan=14 style=background:#dcdcdc; text-align:center| Midfielders

 

 

|-
! colspan=14 style=background:#dcdcdc; text-align:center| Forwards 

 

|-
! colspan=14 style=background:#dcdcdc; text-align:center| Players transferred out during the season

Goalscorers

Last updated: 11 March 2023

References

Hertha BSC seasons
Hertha BSC